Darshana Banik is an Indian model and actress. Banik works for the Bengali and Telugu film industry. She started her career as a model and brand ambassador for different brands like Colors, Vodafone, and Boroline.

Early life 
Darshana Banik was born in West Bengal, India. She completed her undergraduate degree from East Calcutta Girls College and postgraduate degree from Rabindra Bharati University. She started modeling when she was a student.

Filmography

Web series

Television

Music videos

References

External links 
 
 
 

Living people
Indian film actresses
Actresses from Kolkata
Actresses in Bengali cinema
21st-century Indian actresses
Year of birth missing (living people)